Stadtpark may refer to:

 Stadtpark, Vienna, a public park in Vienna, Austria
 Hamburg Stadtpark, a public park in Hamburg, Germany
 Stadtpark (Vienna U-Bahn), a station on line U4